Saya San also spelled Hsaya (original name Yar Kyaw, ; 24 October 1876 – 28 November 1931) was a physician, former monk and the leader of the Saya San Rebellion of 1930–1932 in British Burma. The series of uprisings that have been called the Saya San Rebellion has been regarded as one of Southeast Asia's quintessential anti-colonial movements. Because of its national and historical nature, discussions about Saya San and the rebellion associated with him has persisted to this day, particularly within academic spheres.

Saya San’s life
Saya San was a native of Shwebo, a centre of nationalist-monarchist sentiment in north-central Burma that was the birthplace of the Konbaung (or Alaungpaya) dynasty, which controlled Myanmar from 1752 until the end of the Third Anglo-Burmese War in 1886.  He was born on 24 October 1876. His original name was Yar Kyaw. His parents were U Kyaye and Daw Hpet, who lived with their five children in the rural agricultural village of Thayetkan. Yar Kyaw was exposed to Buddhist tenets at an early age by studying at the local village monastery. Then he continued his studies at the nearby Hpo Hmu monastery until he was nearly twenty years old. Yar Kyaw left for the village of Nga Kaung Inn soon after with a hope that he could make a better living selling mats and baskets as an alternative to working in the agricultural sector. Eventually, he met and married Ma Kay, and had two children, Ko Po Thin and Ma Sein. As economic condition failed to improve, Yar Kyaw left for Moulmein in Lower Burma, where employment opportunities were better because of the expansion of the rice frontier. Earning his living as a carpenter for some time and then more successfully as a fortuneteller and traditional healer, he wrote two treatises on traditional healing practices that questioned the authority and efficacy of Western medical treatment.

The transition Saya San made from a medical man to a political activist is not very clear. People tend to believe that he joined the General Council of Burmese Associations (GCBA) led by U Soe Thein in 1920s. He began his political career as a representative of his village and soon progressed to lead his township and district branch of Moulmein. In 1924, at the annual congress of the GCBA, 45-year-old Saya San was elected to chair a commission to survey the living conditions of the Burmese peasantry.

In late December 1930, Saya San organized a peasant revolt and proclaimed himself a pretender to the throne who, like Alaungpaya, would unite the people and expel the British authorities. He organized his followers into the “Galon Army” and he was proclaimed “king” at Insein, near Rangoon (Yangon). Quickly, the rebellion drew colonial authority's attention and was suppressed by colonial government. As the revolt collapsed, Saya San fled to the Shan Plateau in the east. By August 1931, however, he was captured at Hokho and brought back to Tharrawaddy. He was tried and sentenced by a Special Rebellion Tribunal. Despite the efforts of his lawyer, Ba Maw, he was executed on November 28, 1931.

Saya San Rebellion
Also known as the Galon Rebellion and Galon Peasant Rebellion.

Anglo-Burmese conflicts

Briefly, the imperial history of Burma had sustained almost eight centuries. In the 9th century the Tibeto-Burman speaking Burmese, began migrating to the Irrawaddy valley from present-day Yunnan's Nanzhao kingdom and then established the Pagan Kingdom in 1057. Pagan's power slowly waned in the 13th century. Kublai Khan's Mongol forces invaded northern Burma and sacked Pagan city itself, the kingdom fall in 1287. In the second half of the 16th century, the Taungoo dynasty reunified the country, and founded the largest empire in the history of Southeast Asia for a brief period. In the 18th century, the Konbaung dynasty restored the kingdom, and went to war with all its neighbors. The kingdom fought three wars with the British. In 1885, the kingdom was defeated in the Third Anglo-Burmese War, and the King Thebaw, was deported to India. Eventually, Burma was fully annexed into the British Raj in 1886, but the more difficult task of maintaining stability remained, as the colonial government authorities immediately faced a number of uprisings that erupted throughout the formal Burmese Kingdom.

By the 1890s, colonial officials had determined that the main pacification campaigns were successful, and they could concentrate on the business of building a social-economic infrastructure that could support their interest in the vast teak, mineral, and agricultural resources that their new colony provided. Attached as a province of India, British Burma would be subject to administrative policies established in New Delhi as well as the vast array of procedural structures that characterized the Indian Civil Service. The new territories were divided into districts and assigned a commissioner with a small support staff. Through the prism and experience of British India, Burmese people, cultures, languages and histories were constructed by imperial surveys that now sought to map the new territories. Indigenous healing practices, rituals, folktales, notions of authority and village life would be organized and categorized according to how well the district officer understood what he was observing.  Moreover, when the British government annexed the Kingdom of Burma in 1885–1886, they transferred the Burmese royal throne to a museum in Calcutta. Meanwhile, the Palace of Mandalay was converted into a gentlemen's club, which was seen as offensive by the Burmese. In other words, the establishment colonial rule had changed the social landscape of ancient Burma in a manner that caused much resentment.

Resistance movements before Saya San
The colonial government had faced numerous outbreaks of resistance movements throughout 1886–1890. These opposition movements became more intensive and extensive. Some of these rebellions were led by former members of the court, like the Myinzaing Prince, who continued to wield considerable influence over troops and villagers in provincial centers that had once been in alliance with the throne. Other pockets of resistance were led by local headmen and monks but were limited by size and scope. These were often short-lived either due to lack of support or the overwhelming technical advantage of the colonial government.

In the late 1890s, a small group of Buddhist associations with contemporary forms of organization and structure were founded by lay members in an effort to preserve the religion and its place in society.

In 1906, political organizations such as the Young Men's Buddhist Association (YMBA) came into prominence within Rangoon, drawing young clerks and educated elites into working for changes in colonial society through accepted and approved channels. The YMBA focused on improving social conditions and concentrating on educational government on issue of cultural identity. This would pave the way for formation of the General Council of Burmese Associations (GCBA) which planned to participate more directly in political protest and demonstrations. In order to engage rural communities, members of GCBA would travel into the countryside conducting interviews, collecting data, and filling reports to establish lines of communication with emerging village activists. Saya San joined the GCBA and worked in the countryside for more than two years, so he was familiar with rural places and had direct connections with peasants.

Rebellion
In October 1930, there had been earthquakes at Pegu and Pyu. These were heralded as portents, recalling prophesies that the throne of the King of Burma would not remain unoccupied. At the auspicious moment, the coronation of Saya San proceeded in the traditional manner, at a pagoda near Rangoon. Saya San was proclaimed the Thupannaka Galon Raja, and donned the royal raiments prescribed by ancient usage. On 21 December 1930, the Galon Raja moved to his palace on Alaungtang Hill in Tharrawaddy, where a royal city, known as Buddharaja Myo, or “Buddhist King’s Town”, was ceremonially plotted out. The new king disposed of the proper retinue of five queens, four ministers, and four regiments. Saya San promised supporters that he would restore the authority of the Burmese monarchy, revitalize the Buddhist religion and expel the British authorities. Also, he assured his oath-bound followers that they would be protected by his magical charms and tattoos.

On the night of 22 December the first outbreak occurred in the Tharrawaddy district. Tharrawaddy, like most of Lower Burma, suffered severe economic dislocation during the ‘Hoover Slump’. The Great Depression of 1930 had a devastating impact on rice prices. Rice was Burma's most important export commodity and its fortunes on commercial markets affected much of the rural population. The high population density in central Burma and the concentration of land ownership in fewer hands created a large number of disaffected landless laborers increasingly aggrieved with colonial government, whom they blamed for both their inability to work the land independently and for decline of their real incomes as rice worker. Thus, rural cultivators, already frustrated by the drop of the price of rice were quick to respond to Saya San's appeals involving a mixture of anti-tax rhetoric, Buddhist prophecies and guarantees of invulnerability.

In a few weeks it became clear that the violence that began in Tharrawaddy had escalated. The colonial government officials in New Delhi were soon asked by their Rangoon counterparts to dispatch armed forces to quell the rebellion. However, the military support did not produce immediate results. The outbreaks continued to spread in neighboring districts. The rebellion spread to the districts of Pyapon, Henzada, Insein, Pegu, Toungoo, Prome, Thayetmyo, Naungcho Township, and the Northern Shan States. Other rebellion leaders such as U Aung Hla, Bo Aung Shwe, and Bo Aung Pe led uprisings in neighboring districts to secure weapons, raid police stations, and attack government representatives.

Within weeks of the first outbreak, Rangoon authorities responded by seeking special emergency power from India. By June 1931, a Special Rebellion Commissioner, Mr. Booth Gravely, was appointed to manage affairs in Burma. In July 1931, the authorities considered the situation so serious that they (unsuccessfully) asked permission from the government of India to introduce martial law. By August 1931, Saya San was captured. By then, the rebellion had gone on for nearly two years.

The revolt was defeated, and the casualties were not much certain. By the end of 1932, more than 1,000 rebels were killed and a further 9,000 rebels were surrendered or captured. Saya San and 125 other rebels were hanged and almost 1,400 were sentenced to terms of imprisonment or penal transportation.

Galon Raja
Saya San took the name of the Thupannaka Galon Raja (King). This name could be understood in three dimensions within the Burmese context.

The galon is a well-recognized figure in the literature of Hindu-Buddhist Southeast Asia. Galon was a fabulous bird of Hindu mythology. It is often depicted in combat with the Nāga. This cosmic battle between galon and nāga would come to represent ideas about the power of nature, the dualities of the world, and the challenges of the human conditions.

First, after the establishment of British rule, the Nāga was generally recognized as the symbol for the British, while the Galon stood for Burma. Thus in one sense, the Galon acted as an unofficial symbol for anti-British sentiments in Bumra, as the Galon was the vanquisher of the Nāga.

Secondly, The Galon-Nāga symbolism also had other meanings. In Eastern mythology, the Galon represents the sun-force or solar energy, in natural opposition to the liquid quality of earthly waters. The Nāga is an earth symbol that, in its embodiment in serpentine form, partakes of the magical symbolic properties of liquids. The liquid of the serpent is especially fascinating because it is a poison. The Galon is the killer of serpents, and thus the possessor of supernatural power against all forms of lethal poison. Therefore, it is not surprising that most Burmans regarded certain tattoos as effective protection against snakebite. Perhaps at some time in history the tattoo dyes or needles had some genuine medicinal property. On this count we can only speculate, but, in any case, it was a well-entrenched article of Burmese belief. Thus the Galon itself was a symbol or effecter of invulnerability.

The Galon has a third vital symbolic role: in most depictions, the Galon is a vehicle for Vishnu, one of three great deities of the Brahmanic universe. Therefore, the Galon is also regarded a super-potent, triple-threat protector.

Different interpretations
Discussions about the Saya San Rebellion often revolve around its causes and characters. Scholars have studied on it and produced several interpretations in order to locate Saya San's position in Burmese history and examine the rebellion from different aspects.

On the eve of the rebellion, the leading Burmese newspaper, Thu-ri-ya (The Sun) had published an article “A Warning to the British Government” which spoke of Burma as a “keg of dynamite” which could explode at any time.

The colonial government had recorded the event into a report titled The Origin and Causes of the Burma Rebellion (1930-1932), which was published by 1934. It became the fundamental resource for over eighty years. According to the report： As regards the causes it is well known: (1) that the Burman is by nature restless and excitable; (2) that in spite of a high standard of literacy the Burman peasantry are incredibly ignorant and superstitious… Thus, to the authorities, the rebellion could be explained with the framework of superstition. In addition, it rejected any political causes for the rebellion.

D.G.E. Hall, one of the pioneers of writing history on Southeast Asia, who is also a famous historian on Burmese history, disagrees with the reports’ finding. In terms of the cause of the rebellion, he posited political factors rather than economic ones. However, he also recognized the economic discontent present in Burma.  While some scholars have suggested that economic hardship was at the heart of the revolts, others have suggested that initiating a new golden age of Buddhism was an important reason. After the independence of Burma, historians tend to analyze the rebellion in more diverse perspectives.

For those Burmese historians, Saya San was portrayed as an early nationalist hero. These interpretations stressed on economic factors, which was the cause of popular dissatisfaction. Differing from the established discourse, the economic grievances could form the base of the movement. The movement was not aimless, instead, it was rational and justifiable.

John Cady is the first Western historian to term the rebellion the “Saya San rebellion”. He used a vast amount of British documents, including parliamentary papers and police reports, to create a narrative by recognizing the localized form of political expression. In his book A history of modern Burma, Cady wrote that "it was a deliberately planned affair based on traditional Burmese political and religious patterns".

There are also researches that focus on the economic perspective. Written a generation later and no doubt infused with the intellectual currents that informed both peasant studies and Southeast Asian studies, Michael Adas' The Burma delta (1974)amazon and James C. Scott's The moral economy of the peasant: Rebellion and subsistence in Southeast Asia (1976)amazon and Ian Brown's A colonial economy in crisis: Burma's rice cultivators and the world depression of the 1930s (2005)amazon provided in-depth analyses into the economic conditions underlying the uprisings in the 1930s. For these scholars (like their earlier Burmese colleagues), the traditional vocabulary of the rebellion was less a factor in the cause of the insurgency than the unforgiving demands of the rational state's economy.

One can also consider E. Manuel Sarkisyanz's Buddhist Background of the Burmese Revolution employed the idea of Buddhist millenarian to examine the Saya San rebellion. It represented a transition from those earlier studies which trapped in a context of colonialism or nationalism to those discourses which paid attention to the cultural ideas within a more indigenous context.

From 1970s onwards, the “autonomous history” seems to become the tendency of historiography, which reconstructed those historical figures and events by analyzing indigenous culture from the local people's point of view. Another important book regarding Saya San is Michael Adas’s Prophet of Rebellion.Prophets of Rebellion: Millenarian Protest Movements Against the European Colonial Order On the one hand, Adas emphasized that a ‘Prophetic leader’ has ability to start up a millenarian movement. He also provides four other examples to justify his theory in bigger colonial situations.

Maitrii Aung-Thwin's book, “The Return of the Galon King: history, law, and rebellion in colonial Burma.” offers a critical assessment of the history and impact of the narrative of the Saya San revolt, an event taken as formative for Burmese history and studies of peasant rebellion worldwide. This work shows that despite all efforts to write social science objectively, ideology still rules.

While those interpretations have emerged, scholarship has raised many questions about Saya San's role in the revolt. For example, if the colonial government falsified and overstated Saya San's role in the revolt so as to make his execution seem more meaningful than it actually was. Several details of the trial, including a diary produced by the police which outlines Saya San's plan, are not considered to be trustworthy.

Timeline of the Saya San Rebellion
This is a timeline of the rebellion as outlined by historian Parimal Ghosh.

1930
22 December: Rebels strike in the villages around Pashwegyaw. At least two killed.
23 December: Authorities call up 100 military police from Rangoon. Rebels descended on Inywa, killing three.
24 December: Rebels raided Weywa, killing two. They also attack a 50-strong military post of military police in Yedaik.
30 December: Rebels attempt to dynamite the railway bridge north of Inywa.
31 December: 500 rebels challenged military police and get fired upon. Deaths ensue.

1931
4 January: Rising spreads into Yamethin district.
7 January: A better-organized revolt took place in Dedaye township. 
April:  Dacoit gangs attack village headmen and other village officers.
May: Government beefs up forces in Tharrawaddy and Insein with additional strength of 728 civil police.
June: 500 rebels attack the Wettigan police station.
July: The government published an amnesty offer in Henzada, Prome, Thayetmyo, Insein and Tharrawaddy to allow ‘misguided villagers’ to ‘return to respectability and freedom by surrendering’. This offer was not open to those who had participated in a dacoity, or murder of officials or villagers.
1 July: Rebels open fire on a police party from Taungbyauk.
2 July: 150 rebels lost 40 men trying to check government troops crossing the Nulu river.
12 July: Decisive showdown near Sinsakan when a party of 80 rebels attacked government troops under Captain Dart.
End July: Three of his followers are arrested, and Saya San retreats to Shan territory.
August: News emerges about two rebel armies called the ‘Tiger’ and the ‘Lion’ in the Paungde sub-division. Government accounts described them as just two dacoit gangs. At this time there is also news of ‘widespread disloyalty’ in the villages.
1 August: The Emergency Powers Ordinance 1931 was promulgated, and effectively muzzled the press. The government version of the rebellion was given full exposure, and leaflets, posters and handbills were broadcast.
2 August: Saya San is arrested by Hsipaw State officials in Hsumhsai with five others. Saya San's movement is on the decline, and government pressure increases almost everywhere.
10 September to 13 October: Two columns were set up in the Minhla township of Thayetmyo. These columns were composed of detachments from the 14th Field Company and troops of mounted military police. This force was armed rifles, machine guns, and grenades. They visited almost every village in the township. At this time, the government also began to put relatives and sympathisers of the rebels into concentration camps.
23 September: A ‘cult of the sun and the moon’ led by two leaders Saya Chit and Yin Gyi Aung attacked Tazaung village, killing one person. Headmen of the neighbouring Shweindon village arrived to fight, shooting seven rebels and catching twenty others.
October: Several important leaders of the ‘Lions’ were killed, some were arrested, and some surrendered. This put the group under pressure. The ‘Tigers’ also struggled.
24 October: The ‘Tiger's camp was surrounded by the military. They fought, leaving fifteen of their people dead, including a number of their leaders. 
28 November: Saya San is executed

Significance of the Saya San Rebellion
The Saya San rebellion was one of the greatest anti-colonial movements in Southeast Asia in the 20th century, leaving thousands of people dead by the time it had concluded. However, the legacy left behind is that he is still regarded as a national hero to this day, a figure for national unity, and he has even been immortalized in the Burmese banknote. 
The Saya San rebellion is useful because it can help us to understand other revolts and revolutions throughout Southeast Asia especially during the colonial period. The Saya San rebellion case-study demonstrates how contesting historiographies do have an effect on the production of history. Because the colonial narrative formed the dominant discourse of the period, that discourse was able to control the narratives based on the archival data, despite them being biased and framed from only the colonial perspective. In other words, the so-called official archives about the Saya San rebellion did not tell us much about the rebellion, except for the administrative context that combined mostly only disciplines of ethnology, law and geography to reconstruct the narrative.

Consider the Thai Nguyen rebellion or the Tinh Soviet movement that were also happening around the same time as the Saya San rebellion. There were also other sources that could allow us to acquire different perspectives. David Marr writing on Vietnam posits a 'Resistance model' or schema. According to him, there is traditional resistance, typically led by scholar elites. Following this there is a transitional resistance, led by scholar elites trying to be progressive. Finally there is the modern resistance, led by Western-educated leaders. When we overlay the Saya San narrative over David Marr's model of resistance, we can see that the Saya San movement contains elements of both traditional and modernity encapsulated within its nature. James Scott, in writing about revolts in Vietnam and Burma during the early 1900s, comments that these movements are not so much about objective economic conditions, but rather subjective economic conditions. He points to an idealized moral economy that existed before the Western colonial rule, where wealth was re-distributed, with reciprocal rights and obligations that linked village elites with the village people. With the arrival of colonial rule, the people that were able to survive from the distributive networks are thus unable to carry on their livelihoods like before.
Other than framing the rebellion in terms of tradition or modernity, another way of looking at the rebellion is from the perspectives of violence, ideology, and utopia. For example, we can focus on how violence determined the contours of the movement, and also how ideological amalgamated with visions of utopia in the leaders moulded the eventual outcome of the movement.

But can we consider the rebellion to be successful? Does the death of Saya San necessarily mean it was unsuccessful? At that point, to the colonial administrators, it does seem to have been an unsuccessful rebellion. However, the future repercussions were strong. In fact, two years after his capture, the movement still continued. At the same time, Saya San today still evokes sentiments of nationalism, if not patriotism. Also, despite him existing in the modern period, post-colonial narratives still continue to focus on the superstitious aspects such as the tattoos and amulets that he and his people used.

Perhaps what future generations can learn about from the Saya San rebellion is to never assume the complete legitimacy of a source simply because it is the dominant discourse. It could have political repercussions, but it is still useful to always re-examine sources, perspectives, narratives, and historiographies to tease out certain insinuations or biases. Once a re-reading is done, more comprehensive viewpoints whether retrospective or not, could literally change the future. As George Orwell puts it, "He who controls the past controls the future. He who controls the present controls the past."

Footnotes

External links
Famous People, Saya San
Saya San

Bibliography
Maurice Collis, Trials in Burma (London, 1934).

Nationalist movements of Myanmar
Burmese Buddhist monks
People from Sagaing Region
Executed Burmese people
20th-century executions by the United Kingdom
People executed by British Burma by hanging
1931 deaths
1876 births